Hathras Junction railway station is on the Kanpur–Delhi section of Howrah–Delhi main line and Howrah–Gaya–Delhi line. It is located in Hathras district in the Indian state of Uttar Pradesh.It serves Hathras and surrounding areas.

Station oddity
Hathras Junction railway station is one having an oddity. The station is on the  broad gauge Kanpur–Delhi section. A meter-gauge line takes off from this station and goes to Hathras Kila railway station. At the Kanpur-end of the Hathras Junction railway station, the Mathura–Kasganj (now broad gauge) line cuts across the broad-gauge line at right angles and has a separate overhead station named Hathras Road within the same premises. Hathras lies 9 km away in the west and is also served by Hathras City railway station on the broad gauge (previously metre gauge)  line.

History
Through trains started running on the Howrah–Delhi line in 1865–66.

It was transferred to North Eastern Railway in 1952. The Mathura–Kasganj line was converted from -wide metre gauge to  broad gauge in 2009.

Electrification
The Tundla-Hathras-Aligarh-Ghaziabad sector was electrified in 1975–76.

Connectivity

It also facilitates connectivity to many cities like New Delhi, Chandigarh, Lucknow, Kanpur Kota, Jaipur, Tatanagar, Patna, Kolkata etc.

See also
•Hathras Kila railway station

•Hathras City railway station

•Hathras Road railway station

•Tundla Junction railway station

•Aligarh Junction railway station

•Agra Fort railway station

•New Delhi railway station

•Kanpur Central railway station

References

External links

Railway junction stations in Uttar Pradesh
Railway stations in Hathras district
Allahabad railway division
1865 establishments in India
Railway stations opened in 1865
Hathras